Taylor County is a county located in the U.S. state of Texas. As of the 2020 census, its population was 143,208. Its county seat is Abilene. The county was created in 1858 and later organized in 1878. It is named for Edward Taylor, George Taylor, and James Taylor, three brothers who died at the Battle of the Alamo.

Taylor County is included in the Abilene, TX metropolitan statistical area, and is considered part of West Texas.

History

Among first inhabitants of the area were the Penteka. In  1849, Capt. Randolph Marcy, a U. S. Army engineer, passed through, scouting out West Texas-to-California routes.
The Texas legislature established Taylor County in 1858 from Bexar and Travis Counties. The county is named for Alamo defenders Edward, James, and George Taylor.

By 1872, the first cattlemen had ventured into present Taylor County. Six years later,  Taylor County was organized. Buffalo Gap was named county seat. In 1880, the Texas & Pacific Railroad signed an agreement to run tracks through the future city of Abilene.
Abilene was established in 1882, and named after Abilene, Kansas. Abilene became the county seat in 1883. A wagon train of 10 Baptist families arrived in the county that year.

The Abilene Board of Trade was organized in 1890, when 587 farms and ranches were in the county.
The next year,  Hardin-Simmons University was established as Abilene Baptist College by the Sweetwater Baptist Association.
Lytle Lake was created in 1897.

The State Epileptic Colony opened in Abilene in 1904.  In 1906, Abilene Christian University opened its doors as Childers Classical Institute. In the 1920s, Hendricks Medical Center opened in Abilene as West Texas Baptist Sanitarium (1924) and the West Texas Historical Association was chartered in Abilene.
The first senior class of McMurry University graduated (1926). Oil was discovered in the county a few years later (1929).

In 1933, Abilene donated land for use by the Civilian Conservation Corps.

Dyess Air Force Base was established as Abilene AFB in 1942;  it is named in honor of Texas native and Bataan Death March survivor Lieutenant Colonel William Dyess.  The Abilene Philharmonic Orchestra was created, with Jay Dietzer as the first conductor, in 1950.  The  Buffalo Gap Historic Village opened in 1956.

Geography

Major highways
  Interstate 20
  Interstate 20 Business
  U.S. Highway 83
  U.S. Highway 84
  U.S. Highway 277
  State Highway 36
  State Highway 153
  State Highway 351
  Loop 322

Adjacent counties
 Jones County (north)
 Shackelford County (northeast)
 Callahan County (east)
 Coleman County (southeast)
 Runnels County (south)
 Nolan County (west)
 Fisher County (northwest)

Demographics

Note: the US Census treats Hispanic/Latino as an ethnic category. This table excludes Latinos from the racial categories and assigns them to a separate category. Hispanics/Latinos can be of any race.

As of the census of 2000, 126,555 people, 47,274 households, and 32,524 families resided in the county. The population density was 138 people per square mile (53/km2). The 52,056 housing units averaged 57 per mi2 (22/km2). The racial makeup of the county was 80.61% White, 6.73% Black or African American, 0.58% Native American, 1.25% Asian, 0.07% Pacific Islander, 8.35% from other races, and 2.42% from two or more races. About 17.64% of the population was Hispanic or Latino of any race.

Of the 47,274 households, 34.70% had children under the age of 18 living with them, 53.80% were married couples living together, 11.50% had a female householder with no husband present, and 31.20% were not families. About 25.70% of all households were made up of individuals, and 9.70% had someone living alone who was 65 years of age or older. The average household size was 2.54 and the average family size was 3.07.

In the county, the age distribution was as 26.60% under  18, 13.80% from 18 to 24, 27.80% from 25 to 44, 19.30% from 45 to 64, and 12.40% who were 65 or older. The median age was 32 years. For every 100 females, there were 94.10 males. For every 100 females age 18 and over, there were 91.10 males.

The median income for a household in the county was $34,035, and for a family was $40,859. Males had a median income of $28,964 versus $21,021 for females. The per capita income for the county was $17,176. About 10.40% of families and 14.50% of the population were below the poverty line, including 17.60% of those under age 18 and 9.20% of those age 65 or over.

Communities

Cities
 Abilene (county seat) (small part in Jones County)
 Tuscola
 Tye
 Merkel

Towns
 Buffalo Gap
 Impact
 Lawn
 Trent

Census-designated place
 Potosi

Unincorporated communities
 Caps
 Ovalo
 View
 Wylie

Military base
 Dyess AFB

Politics

See also

 Abilene State Park, recreational facility
 Horse Hollow Wind Energy Center, the world's largest wind farm
 Gary D. McCaleb, former mayor of Abilene
 List of museums in West Texas
 National Register of Historic Places listings in Taylor County, Texas
 Recorded Texas Historic Landmarks in Taylor County
 Charles Perry, member of the Texas Senate from Lubbock, was born in Taylor County in 1962.

References

External links
 Taylor County Official Site
 Central Appraisal District of Taylor County

Further reading
 Zachry, Juanita Daniel A History of Rural Taylor County Nortex Press, 1980. .

 
1878 establishments in Texas
Populated places established in 1878
Abilene metropolitan area